Jaden Natalie Leach (born March 16, 1992) is an American beauty pageant titleholder from West Monroe, Louisiana who was named Miss Louisiana 2013.

Biography
She won the title of Miss Louisiana on June 29, 2013, when she received her crown from outgoing titleholder Lauren Vizza. Leach's platform is "Children at Risk" and she said she hoped to help children with learning disabilities to focus on what they excel at during her year as Miss Louisiana. Her competition talent was a vocal rendition of "Can't Let Go." Leach is a graduate of West Monroe High School and is a senior at the University of Louisiana at Monroe, majoring in political science. Leach is the fourth University of Louisiana at Monroe student to be crowned Miss Louisiana in the past five years.

References

External links

 

Miss America 2014 delegates
1992 births
Living people
People from West Monroe, Louisiana
University of Louisiana at Monroe alumni
American beauty pageant winners
Miss Louisiana winners